Thondan may refer to:

Thondan (1995 film), a Tamil political drama 
Thondan (2017 film), a Tamil vigilante drama